International Health is a quarterly peer-reviewed public health journal covering all areas of global health. It was established in 2009 and is published by Oxford University Press on behalf of the Royal Society of Tropical Medicine and Hygiene. The editor-in-chief is Professor David Molyneux. According to the Journal Citation Reports, the journal has a 2018 impact factor of 1.797.

References

External links 
 

Oxford University Press academic journals
Quarterly journals
English-language journals
Publications established in 2009
Public health journals
Academic journals associated with learned and professional societies
Royal Society of Tropical Medicine and Hygiene